Harold Johnson (August 9, 1928 – February 19, 2015) was a professional boxer. He held the NYSAC, NBA/WBA, and The Ring light heavyweight titles from 1962 to 1963.

Boxing career

Johnson was born in Manayunk, Philadelphia. He started boxing while serving in the United States Navy and turned professional in 1946. He won his first twenty-four fights before losing a ten-round decision to Archie Moore in 1949. Moore would be Johnson's biggest career rival. Johnson rebounded with four straight victories, including a ten-round decision win against future Hall of Fame inductee Jimmy Bivins.

Johnson's father, Phil Johnson, was also a professional boxer. Phil and Harold Johnson became the first father/son combination to not only fight the same fighter, but lose to him as well. Both suffered third-round knockout defeats at the hands of future World Heavyweight Champion Jersey Joe Walcott in 1936 and 1950, respectively. Harold lost after suffering an injury to the intervertebral disc in the small of his back.

After five consecutive wins, Johnson resumed his rivalry with Archie Moore, fighting Moore three times in a row between September 1951 and January 1954. All three went the ten-round distance. Johnson lost the rematch, won the rubber match and lost the fourth bout.

In 1952, Johnson split two fights with Bob Satterfield, losing the first by decision and winning the second by knockout, and won a decision over heavyweight contender Nino Valdez. The following year, he defeated former World Heavyweight Champion Ezzard Charles by a split decision. Johnson would finally get a title shot eight years into his career in his fifth and final fight against Archie Moore in 1954. Moore was making the third defense of the World Light Heavyweight Championship. In an exciting fight, Johnson knocked Moore down in the 10th round and was ahead on the scorecards after 13 rounds. But Moore rallied, knocking Johnson down and stopping him in the 14th round.

Johnson outpointed Julio Mederos over ten rounds in 1954. The following year, they had a rematch in Philadelphia. Johnson collapsed after the second round and was carried from the ring on a stretcher. Tests later revealed that Johnson had been drugged with a barbiturate. As a result, the Governor of Pennsylvania suspended boxing in the state for 114 days and instructed the Pennsylvania Athletic Commission to launch a probe. Johnson said he started feeling ill in his dressing room after eating an orange that had been given to him by a stranger who said he was a long-time admirer. A chemical analysis of a piece of the orange showed no trace of a drug or barbiturate. The probe never did uncover who drugged Johnson or how the drug was administered. However, the commission ruled that Johnson knew he was not in condition to fight and should've reported that fact to commission officials on duty that night. He was suspended for six months and his purse was forfeited.
 
When the National Boxing Association (NBA) withdrew recognition of Archie Moore as World Light Heavyweight Champion for failure to defend, Johnson defeated Jesse Bowdry in 1961 by a ninth-round technical knockout to capture the vacant NBA title. In his first title defense, Johnson stopped Von Clay in two rounds. After defeating second-ranked heavyweight contender Eddie Machen by a ten-round decision in a non-title bout, Johnson successfully defended his title for a second time with a split decision victory over 4th-ranked light heavyweight contender Eddie Cotton.

Johnson gained universal recognition as World Light Heavyweight Champion when he defeated Doug Jones in 1962 by a decision in fifteen rounds. He successfully defended the undisputed title once, outpointing Gustav Scholz in Berlin, then lost it to Willie Pastrano by a fifteen-round split decision in 1963. Johnson would never fight for a title again and retired in 1971 with a record of 76–11 with 32 knockouts.

Johnson was inducted into the World Boxing Hall of Fame in 1992 and the International Boxing Hall of Fame in 1993.

Johnson was named the 7th greatest light heavyweight of the 20th century by the Associated Press in 1999. Three years later, The Ring magazine ranked Johnson 7th on the list "The 20 Greatest Light Heavyweight of All-Time" and 80th on the list "The 80 Best Fighters of the Last 80 Years." Johnson died at the age of 86 on February 19, 2015.

Professional boxing record

See also
List of light heavyweight boxing champions

References

External links

Harold Johnson – CBZ Profile

|-

|-

1928 births
2015 deaths
Boxers from Pennsylvania
Light-heavyweight boxers
American male boxers
International Boxing Hall of Fame inductees
United States Navy sailors